Carl Ludwig von Hablitz (2 April 1752 – 9 October 1821), also known as Karl Ivanovich Gablits, was a Prussian-born Russian botanist.

Biography
Hablitz was born in Königsberg, in 1758 his father was invited to work on the University of Moscow. Carl arrived at Russia at the age of 6 years. He studied to be a scientific botanist and later taught at the University of Moscow for many years. He was a member of the Imperial Russian Academy of Sciences.

He was the author of Physical description of Taurid area, its position and three empires of nature (1785).

Hablitz died in St. Petersburg.

He was the maternal grandfather of the Russian composer Alexander Serov and great-grandfather of the Russian painter Valentin Serov.

References 

1752 births
1821 deaths
Scientists from Königsberg
18th-century German Jews
19th-century botanists from the Russian Empire
18th-century botanists from the Russian Empire